Tommy Head (born June 4, 1945 in Robertson County, Tennessee) is a Tennessee Democratic politician and a former member of that state's House of Representatives. He is also a farmer and a utility contractor.

Head is a 1965 graduate of Cumberland College in Lebanon, Tennessee with an associate's degree, and a 1967 graduate of Austin Peay State University in Clarksville, Tennessee.  He taught high school and coached basketball for two years after his university graduation.  He is the brother of legendary women's basketball coach Pat Head Summitt.

In 1986, Head was elected to the Tennessee House of Representatives and served nine terms until being defeated for reelection in 2004.  He served District 68.  While in the House he served as the chairman of several subcommittees and the vice-chairman of several committees, mostly those dealing with finance. He was regarded as one of the chamber's most powerful Middle Tennessee-based members at one point.

Public Office 

 House member of the 95th through 103rd General Assemblies

 Chair, House Finance, Ways and Means Committee

 Member, House Transportation Committee

 Member, House Calendar and Rules Committee

 Member House Public Transportation & Highways Subcommittee

 Member, Joint Select Oversight Committee on Education

 Member, Joint Fiscal Review Committee

 Member, Joint Pensions and Insurance Committee

 Member, Joint TACR Committee

Community Involvement 

 Clarksville Area Chamber of Commerce

 Austin Peay State University Tower Club

 Tennessee Farm Bureau

 Tennessee Sheriffs Association

 EDC Executive Committee

References

1945 births
Living people
Members of the Tennessee House of Representatives